The North Fork Bridge carries Arkansas Highway 5 over the North Fork River, or the North Fork of the White River, in Norfork, Arkansas, United States. It is a modern steel girder bridge, replacing a 1937 Warren deck truss bridge, which was the first road crossing of the North Fork River in Norfork. The 1937 bridge, demolished in 2014, was listed on the U.S. National Register of Historic Places in 1990, but was delisted in 2015.

History
Two of the spans were cantilevered, extending  beyond the piers and providing the suspension points for the other two spans. The bridge was documented by the Historic American Engineering Record in 1988.

See also
List of bridges documented by the Historic American Engineering Record in Arkansas
List of bridges on the National Register of Historic Places in Arkansas
National Register of Historic Places listings in Baxter County, Arkansas

References

External links

Road bridges on the National Register of Historic Places in Arkansas
White River (Arkansas–Missouri)
Historic American Engineering Record in Arkansas
Transportation in Baxter County, Arkansas
Demolished bridges in the United States
National Register of Historic Places in Baxter County, Arkansas
Steel bridges in the United States
Girder bridges in the United States
Warren truss bridges in the United States
Buildings and structures demolished in 2014
Former National Register of Historic Places in Arkansas
Buildings and structures in Baxter County, Arkansas